Anthony W. Dutrow (born April 27, 1958) is an American horse trainer in Thoroughbred horse racing.

The eldest of three brothers involved in Thoroughbred racing, he is the son of the late well-known Maryland trainer Richard E. Dutrow, Sr. A brother to trainer Rick Dutrow, the youngest brother Chip works as Tony's assistant.

Tony Dutrow grew up in the racing business and as a boy helped out at his father's barn. Having learned to condition horses, he took out his training license and earned his first win in 1975 at Delaware Park Racetrack. He worked with his father for several years then beginning in 1985 with trainer Bobby Frankel in California until going out on his own in 1987.

References
 Anthony Dutrow at the NTRA
 October 18, 2007 Bloodhorse.com article on Tony Dutrow registering his 1,000th win

1958 births
Living people
American horse trainers
Sportspeople from Hagerstown, Maryland